For the rural slang name for southeastern Prince County, Prince Edward Island, see East Prince (locality).

East Prince was a federal electoral district in Prince Edward Island, Canada, that was represented in the House of Commons of Canada from 1896 to 1904.

This riding was created in 1892 from parts of Prince County and Queen's County ridings.

It was abolished in 1903 when it was redistributed into Prince and  Queen's ridings.

It consisted of the town of Summerside, the eastern part of Prince County, and parts of Queen's County.

Election results

By-election: On Mr. Yeo being called to the Senate, 19 November 1898

See also 

 List of Canadian federal electoral districts
 Past Canadian electoral districts

External links 
Riding history for East Prince (1892–1903) from the Library of Parliament

Former federal electoral districts of Prince Edward Island